The following is a list of notable Kannada language newspapers

Daily 
 
 Hosa Digantha
 Kannada Prabha
 Karavali Ale
 Mangaluru Samachara
 Mysooru Mithra
 Prajavani
 Samyukta Karnataka
 Sanjevani
 Udayavani
 Usha Kirana 
 Varthabharathi
 Vijaya Karnataka
 Vijayavani
 Vishwavani

Weekly 

 Hai Bangalore
 Lankesh Patrike
 Suddi Sangaati

See also 
 Media in Karnataka
 List of Kannada films
 List of Kannada magazines
 List of Kannada radio stations
 List of Kannada television channels
 List of newspapers in India

 
Kannada